The  Montezuma-Cortez School District RE-1 is a public school district in Montezuma County, Colorado, United States, based in Cortez, Colorado, United States.

Schools
The Montezuma-Cortez School District RE-1 has one preschool, five elementary schools, one middle school and one high school. In addition, it serves three charter schools.

References

External links

School districts in Colorado
Education in Montezuma County, Colorado